Giovanni Cantoni (31 December 1818 – 15 July 1897) was an Italian physicist and political figure.

Life 
He taught at the University of Pavia, where Carlo Marangoni was among his students, and headed the Italian metrological service from 1865–1878.

In 1848, he participated in the Five Days of Milan and directed the secretary of defense committee for the provisional government of Lombardy. In 1872, he became a member of the Accademia dei Lincei.

Works in physics 

 Lezioni su le condizioni fisiche della elasticità, 1867 – Lessons on the physical conditions of elasticity.
  
 
 Su alcuni principj di elettrostatica, 1873 – On some principles of electrostatics.

References

External links
Biography at Treccani.it 

1818 births
1897 deaths
19th-century Italian physicists
Academic staff of the University of Pavia